Kalash l'Afro (born in Berre-l'Étang, Bouches-du-Rhône in 1979) is a French rapper of Tunisian origin.

Part of Berreta

Born to Tunisian parents who had immigrated to France, he started releasing his materials through tapes starting 1997, in 2009 he formed the rap band Berreta with Sheir, Skwal and Belek and through the label Baraka Muzik, a number of albums as Berreta: L'estanque en déplacement (1999), Rimes 2 zone (2004) and L'encre est dans le chargeur (2005).

Solo career
Starting 2005, Kalash l'Afro started working on his own, initially releasing the mixtape Ghettoven (2006). His official album Cracheur de flammes in 2007 saw collaborations from Keny Arkana, Soprano, Le Rat Luciano, Mystik, Lino, Lil' Saï and members of Berreta. The album charted at #91 on SNEP French Albums Chart. He followed it with the maxi Légitime'' (2008) again a charting release.

Discography
As part of Berreta

As Kalash l'Afrop

References

French rappers
1979 births
Living people
French people of Tunisian descent